Djufrie Asmoredjo is an Indonesian politician. He was a leading figure of Jakarta's PPP Chapter in the 1990s, and was chairman for a period. He was a candidate in the 1992 Indonesian legislative election.

References

United Development Party politicians
Living people
Year of birth missing (living people)
Place of birth missing (living people)
20th-century Indonesian politicians